Robert Hugh "Pete" McClanahan (October 24, 1906 – October 28, 1987) was a pinch hitter in Major League Baseball. He played in seven games for the Pittsburgh Pirates during the 1931 season.

References

External links

1906 births
1987 deaths
Baseball players from Texas
Fort Worth Panthers players
Henderson Oilers players
Palestine Pals players
People from San Jacinto County, Texas
Pittsburgh Pirates players
Shreveport Sports players